Alpin Gallo (born 12 January 1974 in Librazhd, Albania) is an Albanian retired football defender. He last played for KS Shkumbini Peqin in the 2008/2009 Albanian Superliga season. He is also a former Albanian international, having earned 9 caps from 1994 through 1998.

International career
Gallo made his debut for Albania in a May 1994 friendly match against Macedonia and earned a total of 9 caps, scoring no goals. His final international was a September 1998  European Championship qualification match against Georgia.

National team statistics

Managerial career
Gallo resigned from his post as head coach of Tirana in November 2013. In February 2016 he succeeded Luan Metani as manager of Turbina Cerrik.

Honours
Albanian Superliga: 6
 1995, 1996, 1997, 1999, 2000, 2002

References

1974 births
Living people
People from Librazhd
Association football defenders
Albanian footballers
Albania international footballers
KS Sopoti Librazhd players
KF Tirana players
KF Skënderbeu Korçë players
KF Bylis Ballsh players
FK Dinamo Tirana players
FK Partizani Tirana players
KS Kastrioti players
KS Shkumbini Peqin players
Albanian expatriate footballers
Expatriate footballers in Switzerland
Albanian expatriate sportspeople in Switzerland
Albanian football managers
KF Tirana managers